Karl Maria Prosper Laurenz Brandi (20 May 1868 – 9 March 1946) was a German historian.

In 1890–91, he wrote his dissertation on the Reichenauer documents: Die Reichenauer Urkundenfälschungen, which served as Volume 1 of Quellen und Forschungen zur Geschichte der Abtei Reichenau. He followed his teacher to Berlin in 1891–95. The Munich Historical Commission directed him to complete the posthumous works on August von Druffel's contributions to imperial history and the Council of Trent, Monumenta Tridentina. In 1895 he completed his own habilitation in Göttingen. From 1902 until his retirement in 1936, and again, from the outbreak of World War II until shortly before his death, he held a professorship for German History at the University of Göttingen.  His study of Charles V, Holy Roman Emperor represented a ground breaking shift in the study of the importance of Charles's reign. According to Brandi, Charles V was the last monarch of Germany to have attempted the establishment of the medieval universal christian monarchy: in this, the Emperor was influenced by the legacy of his predecessors dating back to Charlemagne and by the amalgamation of Burgundian, Spanish, and Austrian court traditions.

Works
 Mittelalterliche weltanschauung, humanismus und nationale bildung: Vortrag gehalten in der versammlung der Vereinigung der freunde des humanistischen gymnasiums in Berlin und der provinz Brandenburg am 23. Januar 1925.  Weidmann, 1925 – Medieval worldview, humanism and national education.
Geschichte der Geschichtswissenschaft, Universitäts-Verlag, 1947 – History of historical science.
 The emperor Charles V; the growth and destiny of a man and of a world empire, English translation published in 1939. This book is mentioned in Anne Frank's The Diary of a Young Girl, who, while hiding with her family from the Nazis in Amsterdam, read and enjoyed the book.

References

Citations

Bibliography

 

1868 births
1946 deaths

19th-century German historians
20th-century German historians
Academic staff of the University of Göttingen
Academic staff of the University of Marburg
Members of the Bavarian Academy of Sciences
Members of the Prussian Academy of Sciences
Members of the Austrian Academy of Sciences
Members of the Hungarian Academy of Sciences
German People's Party politicians
National Liberal Party (Germany) politicians
People from Meppen
Members of the Göttingen Academy of Sciences and Humanities